HMS Tiara (P351) was a Royal Navy Group Three T-class submarine laid down at Portsmouth Dockyard on 8 April 1943 and launched on 18 April 1944. However the war ended before she was completed and she arrived at Dover Industries for scrapping in June 1947 .  Her sister vessel  was launched on the same day at Portsmouth dockyard and not completed either. She would have been the only ship of the Royal Navy to bear the name Tiara.

References

 
 

 

British T-class submarines of the Royal Navy
Ships built in Portsmouth
1944 ships
World War II submarines of the United Kingdom